Pici is one of the two suborders of the order Piciformes and includes two infraorders Ramphastides (toucans and barbets) and Picides (honeyguides and woodpeckers). Members of this suborder are often called "true piciforms", as the jacamars of Galbulidae and puffbirds of Bucconidae (of the other piciform suborder Galbuli) were thought to be not closely related to toucans and woodpeckers, but instead to the order Coraciiformes. However, analysis of nuclear DNA in a 2003 study placed them as a sister group to the rest of the Piciformes, also showing that the groups had developed zygodactyl feet before separating. Per Ericson and colleagues, in analysing genomic DNA, confirmed that puffbirds and jacamars were sister groups and their place in Piciformes.

References

External links
 Tree of Life Piciformes

 
 
Extant Rupelian first appearances